Microworld is a 1981 text adventure published by Med Systems Software for the TRS-80. An Atari 8-bit family version followed.

Gameplay
Microworld is a text only adventure game in which the player becomes an "electroid" and searches inside the circuits of a TRS-80 computer for colored integrated circuit chips.

Reception
Allen L. Wold reviewed Microworld in The Space Gamer No. 52. Wold commented that "for the intelligent child, the adventure gaming beginner, or someone who'd just like to 'get into' his or her computer for a while, Microworld can be a lot of fun."

Reviews
SoftSide (mentioned in table of contents, but scan is cut off)

References

External links 
 

1980s interactive fiction
1981 video games
Adventure games
Atari 8-bit family games
Cyberpunk video games
TRS-80 games
Video games about microbes
Video games developed in the United States